Valery Iosifovich Fabrikant (born 28 January 1940) is a former associate professor of mechanical engineering at Concordia University in Montreal, Quebec, Canada. On 24 August 1992, after years of increasingly disruptive behaviour at the university, he shot and killed four colleagues and wounded one staff member.

His case stimulated much research and debate about gun control, and how universities should manage difficult employees. By 1994, the university gathered over 200,000 signatures with the Coalition for Gun Control on a petition to ban the private ownership of handguns in Canada. After the Cowan Report criticized the university for being too "vague" and "slow" in dealing with Fabrikant, in 1995 they appointed an advisor to implement a "Code of Rights & Responsibilities", and later a "Code of Ethics", adopted in 1997,  and created civil behaviour and conflict resolution initiatives like the Peace and Conflict Resolution Series in 2003.

He was sentenced to life in prison and was denied parole or temporary leave in 2015 and again in 2022. After he filed numerous court proceedings, the Quebec Superior Court declared him a vexatious litigant, in 2000.

Background
Born in Belarus (then in the Soviet Union), Fabrikant emigrated to Canada in 1979. Although he claimed to be a political dissident, journalists from the Montreal Gazette later found that he had been dismissed from numerous positions in the USSR because of disruptive behaviour.

Fabrikant was hired at Concordia University in 1980, where he worked first as a research assistant under limited grant money. After several years, he was promoted to academic positions included in departmental funding. He taught students and conducted independent research, despite students, staff and faculty having reported behavioural problems ranging from "undesirable to intolerable".

Fabrikant attempted to collect information to blackmail officials into promoting him, threatened officials and colleagues and blamed others for all of his problems. He blamed his peers for his being denied tenure and for seeking to have his employment terminated.

Over several months of escalating charges from late 1991 into 1992, he accused the university of tolerating the practice of academics being listed as co-authors on papers to which they had not contributed. In 1992, in the midst of an email campaign against numerous university officials, Fabrikant went to court to try to have the names of several colleagues removed from research papers he had written in the 1980s. That case would not be concluded until November 2007, when Quebec Superior Court Judge Nicole Morneau dismissed it under a provision of the Quebec Code of Civil Procedures designed to treat cases found to be frivolous or unfounded. It was later reopened, and eventually dismissed for good in March 2011.

Shooting

By August 1992, Fabrikant faced a contempt of court charge due to his behaviour during his suit. In addition, he had been conducting an email campaign against numerous members of the university. He claimed fears of being killed in jail.

On 24 August 1992, Fabrikant took concealed weapons and ammunition with him to the Engineering Department of the university, where he went on a shooting spree on the ninth floor of the Henry F. Hall Building. He killed Department Chair Phoivos Ziogas and professors Matthew Douglass, Michael Hogben and Jaan Saber. He wounded Elizabeth Horwood, a departmental staff secretary.

Phoivos Ziogas lived for a month in a coma before he died of massive internal injuries from the bullet ricocheting within his body.

Trial and psychiatric assessment
Fabrikant represented himself at his five-month-long trial, after firing ten lawyers in the process. His claim was that the murders were done in "self-defence" because members of the faculty were "trying to give [him] a heart attack". During the trial, he compared himself to the abused orphans in the Mount Cashel Orphanage.

After several weeks of observing his eccentric behaviour, the judge suspended the proceedings to conduct a hearing into Fabrikant's mental fitness to stand trial. After a month's review, the two court-appointed psychiatrists found him fit to stand trial, although "severely paranoid and hostile". The judge ended Fabrikant's performances in the courtroom and sent the case to the jury. With the essential facts not in doubt, they found Fabrikant guilty of first-degree murder, and the court sentenced him to life imprisonment.

Despite two psychiatrists ruling in his favour, Fabrikant thought that he was insulted by them. According to Louis Morissette, Fabrikant asked to meet with him. Morissette worked at the Institut Philippe-Pinel de Montréal, an institution for the mentally disturbed, and specialized in legal psychiatry. Fabrikant spent several days there during his trial. Morissette spent several hours over a few days with Fabrikant. "Fabrikant wanted my help to counter-argue the two psychiatrists' opinion on him in court, and to help him argue that psychology has no scientific basis and proves nothing."

Morissette disagreed with the conclusions of the two psychiatrists appointed by the court. "Mr. Fabrikant suffers, in my opinion, from more than a simple personality disorder, […] he could be treated by pharmaceutical products, a treatment he always refused." "We often push the trial dates of people who suffer from complications because of heart attacks. In my opinion, Fabrikant is not fit to stand trial."

Aftermath
 Concordia's Board of Governors had earlier adopted a policy banning firearms on the university campus. After the murders, the university joined the Coalition for Gun Control and gathered signatures for a petition calling for tougher national gun laws. In March 1994, Concordia representatives presented members of Parliament with a 200,000-signature petition to ban the private ownership of handguns in Canada.
 Concordia University commissioned two independent inquiries into events surrounding the murders. This followed a university review of scholarship guidelines. The university improved its administrative procedures and research ethics guidelines, as did Canada's research funding agencies. An investigation of faculty research in Fabrikant's department revealed that, while some of Fabrikant's claims about mismanagement of grants funds were factually correct, he did not challenge colleagues' work until he was well into his attacks against the university.
 The Cowan report, which studied the interactions between university officials and Fabrikant from a personnel management perspective, found that "The warnings and strictures placed upon him [Fabrikant] which directly related to his behaviour, (when they existed at all), were too mild, too vague, or (finally) too slow and ponderous."
 The Natural Sciences and Engineering Research Council froze the research accounts of the three academics whom Fabrikant had accused of mismanaging funds. Two were temporarily suspended and one took an early retirement. One was re-hired as a research professor.
 The university adopted new rules governing financial accountability and scientific integrity, improvements already in process at the time of the August 1992 events. The Internal Audit function was also restructured.
 In 1995, the university adopted "The Code of Rights & Responsibilities" and named an advisor on the code. It set out standards of conduct for all members of the university. Further work was done on a new code of ethics, resulting in adoption in 1995 of a partial version of "The Code of Ethics: Guidelines for Ethical Actions". In 1997, the full version was adopted.
 The university created initiatives related to civil behaviour and conflict resolution, including the Peace and Conflict Resolution Series that began in 2003.

Fabrikant is serving his sentence at Archambault Institution in Sainte-Anne-des-Plaines, Quebec.

Fabrikant is a usenet user known for posting in newsgroups, particularly can.general and can.politics, as well as on his website. All contain trial transcripts and his version of events. He has claimed to be the innocent victim of a conspiracy. From prison, he has managed to circumvent restrictions on his communications to argue his case through a website and other media. He filed numerous legal proceedings with the court system until 2000, when the Quebec Superior Court declared him a vexatious litigant. The court dismissed his bid to clear that status in 2007.

In part because Fabrikant carried out his assault on a university campus, and societies have witnessed rising workplace violence, the case has been extensively studied. Later analysis concluded that "Fabrikant often displayed classic behavioural warning signs indicating potential violence". Within three years of the university's hiring him, Fabrikant had established a reputation of being "a difficult, argumentative and unpredictable individual – and one who seemed to set no limits on his own behaviour". The university failed to address his behaviour early on, and his harassment of students and colleagues increased over the years. The university attempted to change its guidelines for dealing with personnel. The case showed the problems of academic institutions, whose administrators were more used to assessing research, than in managing the behaviour of difficult staff.

Fabrikant has kept doing scientific research and has published over 60 scientific papers from prison, triggering discussions on the ethicality of allowing him to do so.

Works 
  
 
 
A number of authors have praised his previous works.

References

Further reading
 Mathieu Beauregard, La folie de Valery Fabrikant: une analyse sociologique, Paris: L'Harmattan, 1999

External links
 H. W. Arthurs, Chair; Roger A. Blais, and Jon Thompson, Integrity in Scholarship: A Report to Concordia University, April 1994, Concordia University Records Management and Archives
 John Scott Cowan, Lessons from the Fabrikant File: A Report to the Board of Governors of Concordia University , May 1994, Concordia University Records Management and Archives
 Morris Wolfe, "Dr. Fabrikant's Solution", based on earlier articles by Wolfe in Saturday Night, Actualité and Lingua Franca
 Ian King, "A Psychopath's Online Soapbox: Mass-murdering engineering professor trolls Usenet", Terminal City, 18 August 2005
 "The Fabrikant Affair, August 24, 1992", Concordia University Records Management and Archives
 Fabrikant's publications, Google Scholar search for the publications of V. I. Fabrikant
  V. I. Fabrikant Website, "Legal" – Trial transcripts and appeals
 Frédéric D'Amours, directeur, "Le monde selon Valery Fabrikant" (The world according to Valery Fabrikant), Episode 3, (2004), Un tueur si proche (A killer so near), Documentary TV series (in French)

1940 births
Criminals from Montreal
Academic staff of Concordia University
1992 in Canada
Living people
Soviet emigrants to Canada
Usenet people
Quebec murderers
Canadian mass murderers
Canadian prisoners sentenced to life imprisonment
Canadian people convicted of murder
Belarusian engineers
People from Minsk
Canadian mechanical engineers
Moscow Power Engineering Institute alumni
Vexatious litigants